Daichsun Tngri, also known as Dayisud Tngri and Dayičin Tngri, is a Mongolian war god "of a protective function" to whom captured enemies were sometimes sacrificed. One of the equestrian deities within the Mongolian pantheon of 99 tngri, Dayisun Tngri may appear as a mounted warrior.  Some of his characteristics may be the result of the "syncretistic influence of Lamaism" (Tibetan Buddhism); the 5th Dalai Lama composed invocations to this deity.

See also
Mongolian shamanism

References

Further reading
Heissig, Walther 1964 Ein Ms.-Fragment zum Kult der Dayisud-un Tngri und andere mongolische Fragmente im Ethnographischen Museum Antwerpen, Central Asiatic Journal IX, pp. 190–202.

Tngri
War gods